Elections to Kilmarnock and Loudoun District Council were held on 3 May 1977, on the same day as the other Scottish local government elections. This was the second election to the district council following the local government reforms in 1974.

The election used the original 16 wards created by the Formation Electoral Arrangements in 1974. Each ward elected one councillor using first-past-the-post voting.

Labour won the popular vote despite their vote share decreasing by 16.3% and, as a result, lost overall control of the district council. The party lost five seats to hold seven – two short of an overall majority. The Conservatives tied as the joint-largest party with Labour on seven seats – an increase of three from previous election in 1974. For the first time, the Scottish National Party (SNP) won seats in Kilmarnock and Loudoun as they took the remaining two seats which put them in position as the kingmaker.

Results

Source:

Ward results

Ward 1

Ward 2

Ward 3

Ward 4

Ward 5

Ward 6

Ward 7

Ward 8

Ward 9

Ward 10

Ward 11

Ward 12

Ward 13

Ward 14

Ward 15

Ward 16

References

1977 Scottish local elections
1977